Les Reines Prochaines (in French, "the Next Queens") are a collectively organised pop band and performance group based in Basel, Switzerland. Their highly lyrical songs are rooted in various genres, including tango, folk, and classical music.

Formation 
Les Reines Prochaines were founded in 1987 as Les Reines des Couteaux (in French, "The Queens of the Knives") by Teresa Alonso, Regina Florida Schmid, and Muda Mathis; in the following year, they were joined by Fränzi Madörin and Pipilotti Rist. Years later, Gabi Streiff, Sus Zwick, Sibylle Hauert, Michèle Fuchs, and Barbara Naegelin joined as well.

Touring members have included percussionist Dave Kerman, who also appeared on their 2013 release Blut.

Style 
The group started as a synth-only band (aside from their voices). At present the musicians (of whom several are also visual artists) play bass, drums, accordion, guitar, clarinet, trompette, and flute. In spite of this their arrangements are quite minimalistic, incorporated into a larger multimedia framework. Their lyrics are poetic and political, and often quite provocative. In their performances, each musician has a unique role; instruments are traded, and the format shifts between song, dance, and spoken word.

Their repertoire includes a number of cover songs, including Opfer dieses Liedes (from Chris Isaak's Wicked Game) and Evening, a sparse cover of the Rolling Stones's As Tears Go By.

Discography 
 1990: Jawohl, sie kann’s. Sie hat’s geschafft. (LP/CD)
 1993: Lob Ehre Ruhm (LP/CD)
 1995: Le coeur en beurre double gras (CD)
 1999: Alberta (CD)
 2003: Protest und Vasen (CD)
 2005: Starke Kränze (CD)
 2013: Blut (CD)
 2017: Schlafen ist individuelle Anarchi (Sleeping is individual anarchy) limited Vinyl Single LRP009

Film 
 Claudia Willke. Les Reines Prochaines – Alleine denken ist kriminell. Documentary DE/CH, 2012, 77 minutes.

References

External links 
 Official Site
 Discogs

Swiss rock music groups
Swiss folk music groups
All-female bands